Driftwood is wood that has been deposited on land by the action of waves.

Driftwood may also refer to:

Places

Canada
 Driftwood Range, a mountain range in British Columbia

Ontario
 Driftwood, Ontario, an unincorporated community in the Cochrane District
 Driftwood Avenue, a road in Toronto
 Driftwood Provincial Park, a provincial park near Deep River, Ontario
 Driftwood stop, an under-construction Toronto subway stop

United States
Drift Falls, also known as Driftwood Falls, Pisgah National Forest, North Carolina
 Driftwood, Oklahoma
Driftwood, Pennsylvania, a borough
Driftwood, Texas, an unincorporated community
Driftwood, Washington, an unincorporated community
Driftwood Creek, a river in Alaska
Driftwood River, Indiana
Driftwood Township, Jackson County, Indiana

In films
Driftwood (1928 film), directed by Christy Cabanne
Driftwood (1947 film), directed by Allan Dwan; starring Natalie Wood
Driftwood (2006 film), directed by Tim Sullivan
Driftwood (2016 film), directed by Paul Taylor
Otis B. Driftwood, Groucho Marx's character in the film A Night at the Opera

In music

Songs
"Driftwood", a song by the band A-ha; the B-side to the song "The Sun Always Shines on T.V."
"Driftwood", a song composed by Jean Sibelius (op. 17/7) over an untitled poem by Ilmari Kianto
"Driftwood", a song from the 2010 album Ø (Disambiguation) by the band Underoath
"Driftwood" (The Moody Blues song), 1978
"Driftwood" (Travis song), 1999

Other
Driftwood (band), an Americana band from Binghamton, New York
Driftwood, the project name used by the group Shocksteady to release the trance single "Freeloader"
Driftwood (album), a 2001 album by Eddi Reader
Driftwood, a 2014 album by Wolfgang Muthspiel
Jimmy Driftwood (1897–1998), American folksinger and songwriter

Other uses
Driftwood (horse) (1932–1960), an American Quarter Horse Hall of Fame inductee
Driftwood Inn and Restaurant, a historic site in Vero Beach, Florida
Operation Driftwood, a British Second World War commando raid
Driftwood (novel), a 2014 novel by Elizabeth Dutton

See also
Driftwood catfish